Eric Lamaze (born April 17, 1968) is a Canadian retired showjumper and Olympic champion. He won individual gold and team silver at the 2008 Beijing Olympics, riding his famed horse Hickstead. Lamaze has won three Olympic medals, as well as four Pan American Games medals and one World Equestrian Games bronze. He is considered one of Canada's best showjumpers.

Early life
Lamaze was born in Montreal, Quebec. He started riding at age twelve and worked in exchange for time in the saddle. He was considered a promising junior rider, and trained under Roger Deslauriers, George Morris, Jay Hayes and Hugh Graham.

Career

1991–2006 
Lamaze began competing at the grand prix level in 1991 or 1992. A year later, he was named to the Canadian equestrian team. His first major competition as a national team member was the 1994 World Equestrian Games.

Lamaze was named to the Canadian team for the 1996 Summer Olympics in Atlanta, Georgia, but lost his place and received a four-year suspension after testing positive for cocaine. Arbitrator Ed Ratushny overturned the suspension, although Lamaze had already missed the Atlanta Games when the ruling was delivered.

Lamaze rebuilt his career and ascended the rankings, being again regarded as a key member of the Canadian team for the Sydney Games. However he tested positive for a banned stimulant, which resulted in his removal from the team and facing a lifetime ban. Right afterwards, a despondent Lamaze contemplated suicide and while drunk he smoked a cigarette laced with cocaine. Forty-eight hours later, the test for the banned stimulant was reversed on appeal, however Lamaze then tested positive for cocaine which would also have meant a lifetime ban. Arbitrator Ed Ratushny overturned the cocaine test, but the Canadian Olympic Committee refused to reinstate Lamaze on the Canadian team.

2007–2011: Hickstead years 
In 2007, Lamaze became the first Canadian jumping rider in 20 years to make the top ten in the world rankings. He was also the first North American jumping rider to exceed one million in prize money a year, a third of these earnings the result of winning the CN International Grand Prix at Spruce Meadows. The CN International Grand Prix was Lamaze's first major win with Hickstead.

Lamaze competed in the Beijing Olympics, riding the stallion Hickstead. He was awarded a silver medal after a strong performance in the team event.  Lamaze went on to win a gold medal in the individual show jumping event of the 2008 Beijing Olympics at the Shatin Equestrian Venue in Hong Kong as a result of a jump off between himself riding Hickstead and the Swedish rider Rolf-Göran Bengtsson, riding Ninja.

In the January 2009 Rolex World Rankings for show jumping by the International Equestrian Federation, Lamaze was named to the top spot for the first time. In October 2009, Lamaze won the €120,000 Equita Masters in Lyon, France, riding Hickstead.

Lamaze returned to first place in the Rolex Rankings for July 2010. In July that year, he had two major wins with Hickstead, at the Aachen World Equestrian Festival and the Spruce Meadows Queen Elizabeth II Cup.

In 2011, Lamaze and Hickstead won the €200,000 Rome Grand Prix, the €200,000 La Baule Grand Prix, the Spruce Meadows Queen Elizabeth II Cup, the €23,000 1.55m in Rotterdam, the $1 million CN International Grand Prix, and the €100,000 Barcelona Grand Prix.

2012–2022 
After the death of Hickstead in 2011, Lamaze selected the nine-year-old mare Derly Chin De Muze to ride at the 2012 London Olympics.

In July 2016, he was again named to Canada's Olympic team, serving as the leader following Ian Millar's decision to not compete again. Lamaze rode the Hanoverian mare, Fine Lady 5.  As a member of Canada's jumping team, he competed in a climactic jump-off for the bronze medal, which was ultimately won by the German team. Later, he won a bronze medal in the individual jumping event, a single knocked rail preventing him from earning a second gold medal.

In 2017, Lamaze was diagnosed with brain cancer, which he revealed to the public in 2019. He continued competing for some time, winning a gold medal at the Spruce Meadows Masters tournament in June of 2019. In 2021, he announced that he would not seek to be part of the Canadian Olympic team for the 2020 Summer Olympics in Tokyo, saying that while his health was stable he felt there were too many risks. Lamaze's battle with brain cancer continued, and on March 31, 2022 he announced that he would be retiring from competition in order to focus on his health. He planned to remain as the Canadian showjumping team's chef d'équipe. After announcing his retirement, he said: "I've always said that I will retire under my own terms when the time is right. The situation with my health has forced me to make the decision earlier than I had envisioned, but the silver lining is that I still have the will to win and can contribute to the Canadian team and the sport I love through my new role."

International Championship Results

See also
Canada at the 2008 Summer Olympics

References

External links

 
 
 
 
 

1968 births
Canadian male equestrians
Canadian show jumping riders
Canadian sportspeople in doping cases
Doping cases in equestrian
Equestrians at the 2007 Pan American Games
Equestrians at the 2008 Summer Olympics
Equestrians at the 2011 Pan American Games
Equestrians at the 2012 Summer Olympics
Equestrians at the 2015 Pan American Games
Equestrians at the 2016 Summer Olympics
French Quebecers
Living people
Medalists at the 2008 Summer Olympics
Medalists at the 2016 Summer Olympics
Olympic equestrians of Canada
Olympic gold medalists for Canada
Olympic bronze medalists for Canada
Olympic medalists in equestrian
Olympic silver medalists for Canada
Sportspeople from King, Ontario
Sportspeople from Montreal
Pan American Games gold medalists for Canada
Pan American Games silver medalists for Canada
Pan American Games bronze medalists for Canada
Pan American Games medalists in equestrian
Medalists at the 2015 Pan American Games
20th-century Canadian people
21st-century Canadian people